The following is a list of the freshwater fish species of Greece. The list includes all the known species, with their valid scientific names, their official common Greek names and any sub-species.

Petromyzontidae

Acipenseridae

Clupeidae

Salmonidae

Esocidae

Cyprinidae

Cobitidae

Siluridae

Anguillidae

Gasterosteidae

Syngnathidae

Cyprinodontidae

Poecilidae

Mugilidae

Atherinidae

Serranidae

Percidae

Centrarchidae

Blenniidae

Gobiidae

Pleuronectidae

References

Greece
fish

Greece